Madahapolakanda is a village in Sri Lanka. It is located within North Western Province.

See also
List of towns in North Western Province, Sri Lanka

External links

Populated places in North Western Province, Sri Lanka